Multi-messenger astronomy is astronomy based on the coordinated observation and interpretation of disparate "messenger" signals. Interplanetary probes can visit objects within the Solar System, but beyond that, information must rely on "extrasolar messengers". The four extrasolar messengers are electromagnetic radiation, gravitational waves, neutrinos, and cosmic rays.  They are created by different astrophysical processes, and thus reveal different information about their sources.

The main multi-messenger sources outside the heliosphere are expected to be compact binary pairs (black holes and neutron stars), supernovae, irregular neutron stars, gamma-ray bursts, active galactic nuclei, and relativistic jets. The table below lists several types of events and expected messengers.

Detection from one messenger and non-detection from a different messenger can also be informative.

Networks
The Supernova Early Warning System (SNEWS), established in 1999 at Brookhaven National Laboratory and automated since 2005, combines multiple neutrino detectors to generate supernova alerts.  (See also neutrino astronomy).

The Astrophysical Multimessenger Observatory Network (AMON), created in 2013, is a broader and more ambitious project  to facilitate the sharing of preliminary observations and to encourage the search for "sub-threshold" events which are not perceptible to any single instrument.  It is based at Pennsylvania State University.

Milestones

 1940s: Some cosmic rays are identified as forming in solar flares.
 1987: Supernova SN 1987A emitted neutrinos that were detected at the Kamiokande-II, IMB and Baksan neutrino observatories, a couple of hours before the supernova light was detected with optical telescopes.
 August 2017: A neutron star collision in the galaxy NGC 4993 produced the gravitational wave signal GW170817, which was observed by the LIGO/Virgo collaboration. After 1.7 seconds, it was observed as the gamma ray burst GRB 170817A by the Fermi Gamma-ray Space Telescope and INTEGRAL, and its optical counterpart SSS17a was detected 11 hours later at the Las Campanas Observatory, then by the Hubble Space Telescope and the Dark Energy Camera. Ultraviolet observations by the Neil Gehrels Swift Observatory, X-ray observations by the Chandra X-ray Observatory and radio observations by the Karl G. Jansky Very Large Array complemented the detection. This was the first gravitational wave event observed with an electromagnetic counterpart, thereby marking a significant breakthrough for multi-messenger astronomy. Non-observation of neutrinos was attributed to the jets being strongly off-axis. In October 2020, astronomers reported lingering X-ray emission from GW170817/GRB 170817A/SSS17a.
 September 2017 (announced July 2018): On September 22, the extremely-high-energy (about 290 TeV) neutrino event IceCube-170922A was recorded by the IceCube Collaboration, which sent out an alert with coordinates for the possible source.  The detection of gamma rays above 100 MeV by the Fermi-LAT Collaboration and between 100 GeV and 400 GeV by the MAGIC Collaboration from the blazar TXS 0506+056 (reported September 28 and October 4, respectively) was deemed positionally consistent with the neutrino signal. The signals can be explained by ultra-high-energy protons accelerated in blazar jets, producing neutral pions (decaying into gamma rays) and charged pions (decaying into neutrinos).  This is the first time that a neutrino detector has been used to locate an object in space and a source of cosmic rays has been identified.
 October 2019 (announced February 2021): On October 1, a high energy neutrino was detected at IceCube and follow-up measurements in visible light, ultraviolet, x-rays and radio waves identified the tidal disruption event AT2019dsg as possible source.
 November 2019 (announced June 2022): A second high energy neutrino detected by IceCube associated with a tidal disruption event AT2019fdr.

References

External links
AMON website

Astronomy
Observational astronomy
Astrophysics
Astronomical sub-disciplines